Fabián Daniel Bustos Barbero (born 28 March 1969) is an Argentine football manager and former player who played as a forward. He is the manager of Ecuadorian club Barcelona SC. 

Bustos played for local sides during the major part of his career, amassing 32 appearances in the Primera División with Lanús and Belgrano. He also played in Uruguay with Nacional, in Bolivia with Jorge Wilstermann, and in Ecuador with Deportivo Quito, Macará, Manta and Deportivo Saquisilí, but retired back in his home country with Estudiantes de Buenos Aires.

After retiring, Bustos worked as an assistant manager before becoming a manager in 2009, with Manta. He continued to manage in Ecuador, winning two Ecuadorian Serie A titles with Delfín and Barcelona SC before being named in charge of Brazilian club Santos in 2022.

Playing career
Born in Córdoba, Bustos began his senior career with local side  in 1986.

In 1992, Bustos signed for Lanús in the Primera División, but featured sparingly before moving to fellow league team Belgrano in 1994. He went on to play for second division sides in the following five seasons, representing Deportivo Morón, Juventud Antoniana, Atlético Tucumán and Cipolletti, before moving abroad in 2000 with Bolivian side Jorge Wilsterman.

Bustos moved to Ecuador in 2000, and signed for Deportivo Quito. He then played for Manta, Macará and Deportivo Saquisilí in the country, before returning to Argentina in 2004 with El Porvenir.

In 2005, Bustos joined Estudiantes de Buenos Aires, and retired with the club in the following year, aged 36.

Managerial career

Early career
After being an assistant manager at Sarmiento, El Porvenir and Acassuso, Bustos was named manager of former side Manta on 15 July 2009. He opted to leave the club on a mutual agreement on 8 December 2010, and was named manager of another club he represented as a player, Deportivo Quito, thirteen days later.

Bustos was sacked by Quito on 1 May 2011, and was presented as manager of fellow Serie A team Imbabura on 30 June. He resigned on 25 August, and took over Técnico Universitario for the ensuing season on 16 December.

Dismissed by Técnico Universitario on 14 April 2012, Bustos was later named manager of Macará on 9 July. He resigned from the latter on 28 April 2013, and subsequently returned to Manta on 1 July.

After leaving Manta at the end of his contract in December 2013, Bustos was later named manager of Serie B side LDU Portoviejo. He left the club the following 21 August.

Delfín
Bustos was named in charge of fellow second division side Delfín on 3 January 2015. He led Delfín back to the top tier after 15 years, but was dismissed by the club on 30 April 2016. 

Bustos returned to the club in December 2016, now as a sporting director, but was named manager again in April 2018, after the departure of Guillermo Sanguinetti. He was also in charge of Delfín in their first-ever Serie A title in 2019, but left the club on 15 December of that year.

Barcelona SC
Immediately after leaving Delfín, Bustos took over Barcelona SC. In his first season, he won a second consecutive Serie A title, and led the club to the semifinals of the 2021 Copa Libertadores.

On 25 February 2022, Barcelona announced Bustos' departure through a press conference, with his last match in charge of the club occurring the following day.

Santos
On 25 February 2022, Santos announced the signing of Bustos as manager, with his contract to be signed in the following days. On 7 July, after just one win in 13 matches, he was sacked.

Return to Barcelona SC
On 5 September 2022, Bustos returned to his former club Barcelona in the place of departing Jorge Célico.

Personal life
Bustos' older brother Carlos is also a manager and former footballer. A defender, he began his career at Talleres and had the most of his managerial career in Peru and Mexico.

Managerial statistics

Honours
Delfín
Ecuadorian Serie B: 2015
Ecuadorian Serie A: 2019

Barcelona SC
Ecuadorian Serie A: 2020

References

External links
 
 FEF player card

1969 births
Living people
Footballers from Buenos Aires
Argentine footballers
Association football forwards
Club Nacional de Football players
Club Almirante Brown footballers
Club Atlético Lanús footballers
Club Atlético Belgrano footballers
Deportivo Morón footballers
Juventud Antoniana footballers
Atlético Tucumán footballers
Club Cipolletti footballers
C.D. Jorge Wilstermann players
S.D. Quito footballers
Manta F.C. footballers
C.S.D. Macará footballers
El Porvenir footballers
Estudiantes de Buenos Aires footballers
Uruguayan Primera División players
Argentine Primera División players
Primera Nacional players
Bolivian Primera División players
Ecuadorian Serie A players
Ecuadorian Serie B players
Argentine football managers
Manta F.C. managers
S.D. Quito managers
Imbabura S.C. managers
C.D. Técnico Universitario managers
C.S.D. Macará managers
LDU Portoviejo managers
Delfín S.C. managers
Barcelona S.C. managers
Santos FC managers
Argentine expatriate footballers
Argentine expatriate sportspeople in Bolivia
Argentine expatriate sportspeople in Ecuador
Expatriate footballers in Bolivia
Expatriate footballers in Ecuador
Argentine expatriate football managers
Expatriate football managers in Ecuador
Expatriate football managers in Brazil
Expatriate footballers in Brazil